Philippine Assembly elections were held in the Philippines on November 2, 1909.

Results

Votes by province

Note 

A.  Members of the Independent and Inmediatista factions were absorbed by the Nacionalista Party. This led to the combination of their seats which totaled to 59 seats.

See also 
Commission on Elections
Politics of the Philippines
Philippine elections

References

External links 
Official website of the Commission on Elections

1909
Philippines
November 1909 events